Jamie Barresi is a Canadian football coach who was most recently the head coach of the University of Ottawa's football team, the Ottawa Gee-Gees. He was hired as the team's head coach on January 15, 2013 and coached the team for seven years with a 35-21 record. It was announced on March 20, 2020 that Barresi was leaving the program. He coached professionally in the Canadian Football League for nine years including his role as running backs coach for the BC Lions in 2006 where he won a Grey Cup championship. He played CIAU football as a quarterback for the Gee-Gees from 1976 to 1979.

References

External links 
University of Ottawa profile

Living people
Ottawa Gee-Gees football players
Players of Canadian football from Ontario
Sportspeople from Hamilton, Ontario
University of Ottawa alumni
Ottawa Gee-Gees football coaches
Penn State Nittany Lions football coaches
Florida Gators football coaches
Wake Forest Demon Deacons football coaches
UCF Knights football coaches
BC Lions coaches
Hamilton Tiger-Cats coaches
Saskatchewan Roughriders coaches
Winnipeg Blue Bombers coaches
Edmonton Elks coaches
Year of birth missing (living people)